Human is the eleventh studio album by Japanese singer-songwriter Masaharu Fukuyama. It was released on April 2, 2014 through Universal Music Japan. The cover jacket of the album is the image of Fukuyama's brain as seen on an MRI scan. The album reached number 1 on the Oricon albums chart and has been certified platinum by the Recording Industry Association of Japan (RIAJ).

The single's artwork was one of the fifty works entered into the shortlist for the 2015 Music Jacket Award committee.

Track listing

Disc 1

Prelude
Human

246
Cherry

Disc 2

Fighting Pose

Around the World
Beautiful Life
Game

Get the Groove

DVD (Limited Edition)
Human

Fighting Pose

Beautiful Life
Game

Get the Groove

References

2014 albums
Masaharu Fukuyama albums